The Pennsylvania State Ethics Commission is the main ethics commission for the Government of Pennsylvania.

The Commissioners  
The five Commissioners, with two vacancies, are:     
 Nicholas A. Colafella, Chairman
 Mark R. Corrigan, Vice Chairman
 Roger E. Nick, Commissioner
 Melanie F. Depalma, Commissioner
 Vacant
 Michael A. Schwartz, Commissioner
 Shelley Y. Simms, Commissioner

See also
 List of Pennsylvania state agencies
Nevada Commission on Ethics
New Mexico State Ethics Commission
Oklahoma Ethics Commission
Texas Ethics Commission
Wisconsin Ethics Commission

References

State agencies of Pennsylvania
Ethics commissions
Government agencies established in 1979
1979 establishments in Pennsylvania